Søborg is a neighbourhood in Gladsaxe Municipality, located some 10 km northwest of central Copenhagen, Denmark.

Etymology 

The name Søborg literally means "Lake-castle" and derives from a building named Søborghus (Lake-castle-house), which was originally located at the east end of Utterslev lake, now known as Utterslev Mose.

Notable people 

 Ib Nørholm (1931 in Søborg – 2019) a Danish composer and organist
 Ivar Frounberg (born 1950 in Søborg) a Danish composer, organist, and academic
 Astrid Saalbach (born 1955 in Søborg) a Danish playwright and novelist
 Lone Scherfig (born 1959 in Søborg) a Danish film director and screenwriter 
 Lars Bom  (born 1961 in Søborg) a Danish actor in theatre, film and TV 
 Puk Scharbau (born 1969 in Søborg) a Danish actress 
 Iben Hjejle (born 1971 in Søborg) a Danish actress 
 Jon Lange (born 1980 in Søborg) a Danish actor 
 Kristoffer Eriksen (born 1986 in Søborg) a Danish journalist, editor and TV-host
 Tobias Sorensen (born 1987) a Danish male model, grew up in Søborg

Sport 
 Josephine Asperup (born 1992 in Søborg) an ice hockey player
 Matthias Asperup (born 1995 in Søborg) an ice hockey player
 Tom Belsø (1942 in Søborg – 2020) the first Danish Formula One driver
 Niklas Landin Jacobsen (born 1988 in Søborg) a handball player
 Magnus Landin Jacobsen (born 1995 in Søborg) a handball player, and younger brother of Niklas Landin Jacobsen

See also
 Søborg, Gribskov Municipality

References

Gladsaxe Municipality